Roadside Attractions is an American production company and film distributor based in Los Angeles, California, founded on July 27, 2000, by Howard Cohen and Eric d’Arbeloff, specializing largely in independent films. Lionsgate bought a portion of Roadside in 2007.

Filmography
All pictures distributed by Roadside, unless otherwise specified.

2000s

2010s

2020s

Upcoming

References

External links
 
 Online Press Site
 

Companies based in Los Angeles
Mass media companies established in 2003
Film distributors of the United States
Lionsgate subsidiaries